Duane Thomas (February 1, 1961 – June 2000), was an American professional boxer in the super welterweight (154 lb) division. He was born in Detroit, Michigan.

Professional career
Thomas turned pro in 1979 and won the Vacant USBA Light middleweight title in 1983 against Nino Gonzalez. He would go on to win the WBC Light Middleweight Title with a 3rd-round TKO over John Mugabi in 1986 at Caesars Palace in Las Vegas. Thomas would lose the title eight months later, in Merignac, France, in his first defense to Lupe Aquino by decision. In 1988 he challenged WBC Light Middleweight Title holder Gianfranco Rosi, but was dominated and TKO'd in the 7th. He was an elite fighter during his era.

Professional boxing record

Death
Duane Thomas had just made a comeback after 11 years out of the ring, when he was murdered in Detroit over a drug dispute, in 2000.

See also
List of world light-middleweight boxing champions
List of homicides in Michigan

References

External links

 

|-

|-

1961 births
2000 deaths
American male boxers
Boxers from Detroit
African-American boxers
World light-middleweight boxing champions
World Boxing Council champions
People murdered in Michigan
Deaths by firearm in Michigan